Francisco Adolfo Coelho was a Portuguese philologist.

References

Bibliography 

 Leal, João (2018). « Collecte et interprétation, ethnologie et nation : vie et œuvre d’Adolfo Coelho », in BEROSE –  International Encyclopaedia of the Histories of Anthropology, Paris.

External links
 Resources related to research : BEROSE – International Encyclopaedia of the Histories of Anthropology. "Coelho, Adolfo (1847–1919)", Paris, 2018. (ISSN 2648-2770)
 
 

1847 births
1919 deaths
19th-century philologists
20th-century philologists
19th-century Portuguese people
People from Coimbra